Saint Marks is an unincorporated community in Jackson Township, Dubois County, in the U.S. state of Indiana.

History
Saint Marks was laid out in 1872 by M. B. Cox.

Geography

References

Unincorporated communities in Dubois County, Indiana
Unincorporated communities in Indiana
Jasper, Indiana micropolitan area
1872 establishments in Indiana
Populated places established in 1872